Guo Zongxun (14 September 953 – 973) or Chai Zongxun, also known by his posthumous name as the Emperor Gong of Later Zhou, was the third and last emperor the Chinese Later Zhou dynasty, during the Five Dynasties and Ten Kingdoms period. He reigned from July 959, when he succeeded his father Chai Rong (Emperor Shizong of Later Zhou), until February 960, when he was overthrown by his general Zhao Kuangyin (Emperor Taizu of Song), who founded the Song dynasty.

The Emperor Gong was sent away with his mother to Xijing (西京). Despite assurance by the Emperor Taizu of Song that the Chai family would be treated with respect, the Emperor Gong was killed in 973 by Xin Wenyue, an official trying to gain favour with the emperor. Upon hearing the news, the Emperor Taizu ordered a period of mourning and buried the dethroned emperor next to the Emperor Shizong's tomb.

Notes and references

Sources
 
  
  
  

953 births
973 deaths
10th-century murdered monarchs
Later Zhou emperors
Murdered Chinese emperors